Nembrotha chamberlaini is a species of colorful sea slug, a dorid nudibranch, a marine gastropod mollusk in the family Polyceridae. It was first described in 1997.

Distribution
This species is known only from the Philippines and Indonesia.

Description
Nembrotha chamberlaini is white with streaks of orange, yellow, green, or black and occasionally yellow splashed across the upper mantle. It has very distinctive bright red gills and rhinophores. The foot and mouth parts are typically light-purple. This nudibranch has a very characteristic color pattern which is typical of species that display warning coloration to other species.

Nembrotha chamberlaini is easily confused with Nembrotha aurea and Nembrotha purpureolineata. All three species have a similar range of color variation although N. aurea often has orange patches not present in Nembrotha chamberlaini.

N. chamberlaini can reach a length of 100 mm.

Ecology
This species feeds on ascidians and tunicates. It has been seen feeding on the bright-blue ascidian, Rhopalaea sp, as well as other ascidians Clavelina sp., & Oxycorynia sp.
.

References

 "The Slugsite" info at:

External links
 Nembrotha purpureolineata page at nudipixel
 Sea slug forum
 

Polyceridae
Gastropods described in 1997